Olajuwon Bamidele Adeyemo (born 13 February 1995) is a Nigerian footballer who plays as a striker for Newry City AFC. He started his career with UCD in Ireland before playing in Scotland for Dundee United and, on loan, East Fife. He signed for English Premier League club Watford in 2016 and left them in 2017, subsequently signing for Valdres FK in Norway. He then played non-League football in England for Walton Casuals and Lewes before returning to Ireland with Wexford in 2020. He joined Scottish club Cove Rangers in 2021. In 2022 he joined Peterhead FC. Adeyemo signed for Irish Premiership club Newry City AFC in January 2023. 

He was called up to the Nigeria under-23 team in January 2015.

Early life
Born in Nigeria, Adeyemo moved to London, England as a baby and then to Dublin, Republic of Ireland at the age of two. He later went on to play youth football with Stella Maris and St Patrick's Athletic, and was part of the Football Association of Ireland's national youth development programme. His younger brother Jordan Adeyemo is a footballer, currently plying his trade with Wexford.

Playing career

Club
Adeyemo joined UCD from St Patrick's Athletic, where he went on to make his first senior appearance. He joined Scottish Premiership club Dundee United in June 2014 after a spell on trial with Leyton Orient. After making his debut for Dundee United as a substitute in a Premiership match at Kilmarnock on 3 October 2014, Adeyemo signed a contract extension in December 2014 to keep him at the club for a further eighteen months. In February 2015, he joined East Fife in Scottish League Two on a development loan for the rest of the 2014–15 season. Adeyemo left Dundee United in December 2015 after his contract was cancelled by mutual agreement, having made only two substitute appearances for the first team. Adeyemo signed for English Premier League club Watford on 30 March 2016 until 2017 after a successful trial with the club's Under-21s. He was released by Watford at the end of the 2016–17 season and in July 2017 signed for Norwegian 3. divisjon side Valdres FK. Having left Valdres after the 2017 season, Adeyemo had a trial with Scottish Championship club Falkirk in November 2018. He signed for non-league Southern Premier side Walton Casuals in January 2019. Adeyemo transferred to Isthmian League Premier Division club Lewes in February 2019.
On the 30th July 2020, it was announced that Adeyemo has returned to Ireland, signing for League of Ireland First Division side Wexford.

Adeyemo signed for Scottish League One side Cove Rangers on September 9, 2021. He was let go at the end of the 2021-22 season and subsequently signed for Peterhead. He scored one goal in four appearances for the club before being released in December 2022.Adeyemo was announced as a Newry City AFC player in January 2023. He made his debut as a substitute, coming on in a scoreless game against Larne FC at home.

International
Adeyemo, who is also qualified to represent England or the Republic of Ireland, received a call-up to a Nigeria under-23 squad training camp in January 2015.

References

External links 
 
 

1995 births
Living people
English footballers
Nigerian footballers
Association football forwards
St Patrick's Athletic F.C. players
University College Dublin A.F.C. players
Dundee United F.C. players
East Fife F.C. players
Scottish Professional Football League players
Footballers from Greater London
English people of Nigerian descent
Stella Maris F.C. players
English people of Yoruba descent
Yoruba sportspeople
Watford F.C. players
English expatriate footballers
Walton Casuals F.C. players
Expatriate footballers in Norway
Lewes F.C. players
Isthmian League players
Southern Football League players
League of Ireland players
Wexford F.C. players
Cove Rangers F.C. players
Peterhead F.C. players